Con Chrisoulis is a Greek multidisciplinary artist and academic, most famous for his graphic novels, Tales of The Smiths, Dryland, Giant-Size Fascists, and Rebel Rebel.

Career
Chrisoulis was born in Victoria, Australia, to Greek Australian migrants.
Self-taught in the creation and production of comics, in 2010 he earned an ISCED Level 4 degree in Film Editing, in 2014 he earned a BA (Hons) in Graphic Design at the University of Brighton and in 2015 he was awarded a Master of Research in Arts and Cultural Research, during which he experimented on the digital future of the comic book medium.

In 1996, he self-published his first comic book series, Clans, in Melbourne, Australia, which lasted three issues. The following year he collaborated with writer Nick Bugeja on the superhero comic book series Bloodsport (Impulse Comics).
In the late 1990s he migrated to Athens, Greece, and began self-publishing his personal comic book anthology, Tales of Unsurpassed Vanity, one of Greece's longest-running self-published independent comics.  Tales of Unsurpassed Vanity lasted ten issues, ending in 2004.

In 2002, he formed the group that would eventually publish the Greek independent comics anthology SubArt Comics. The group self-published 6 issues collectively. As the group imploded in 2005, Chrisoulis and three other members initiated the first 24-hour comic event in Greece; his story was included in the subsequent 24 Hours SubArt Comics collection (2005)

From 2002 to 2006, Chrisoulis collaborated with  magazine, a Greek comics anthology that was included as a free supplement every Wednesday within Eleftherotypia newspaper. He serialised his science fiction series Vacant Testament (Greek: Κενή Διαθήκη) within the pages of 9 (Ennea) magazine, making it the first long-running sci-fi comics series published in a Greek mainstream comic book.

During the 2000s, he initiated campaigns within his self-published comics in order to advise and help creators set up their own self-published comics, and participated in various self-published comic books, also distributing many in independent stores in Athens and local zine and comics festivals. Some of the comics he participated in include Sapilla #1-3 (2004-2005), Red.Dot Comix #10 (2004) and #12 (2005), Giannis Milonogiannis' Roppongi #2 (2006) and many more.

In 2007, he released the first volume of his acclaimed political satire comic book series, Giant-Size Fascists. The two volumes of Giant-Size Fascists earned him Greek comic book of the year awards by popular vote in 2008 and 2010.

His graphic novel Dryland, which narrates the violent deaths of most of his ancestors in Interwar Greece, was a finalist at the Myriad Editions' First Fictions competition  and was released in 2016 by Markosia Enterprises.

Singer-songwriter of two concept art bands, Autodivine and the UK-based band Ghosts of Future Past, he has released two illustrated concept albums with linear narratives and post-punk aesthetics.

From 2012 until 2014, he wrote and drew a daily online comic strip entitled Tales of The Smiths about the early unknown days of Morrissey and seminal indie band The Smiths, a 450-page collected edition of which will be released by Omnibus Press in 2018.

Since 2016, he has been researching, writing and drawing Rebel Rebel: The graphic biography of David Bowie, the weekly online comics biography of David Bowie, whilst in 2017 he began researching and serialising his latest series King: The graphic biography of Jack Kirby, about the Ashkenazi Jewish origins of the visual creator of Marvel Comics.

He is the creator and art director of Museums News, a website that focuses on museum and exhibition culture.

Con Chrisoulis currently works as a Senior Lecturer in Commercial Art and Illustration at Teesside University, teaching on the undergraduate and postgraduate Comics & Graphic Novels and Graphic Design courses, whilst conducting practice-led academic research within the graphic novel biography field.

Bibliography

Works in Australia
 Clans #1-3. MoJo Comics, 1996-1997.
 Bloodsport #1 (written by Nick Bugeja). Impulse Comics, 1997.

Works in Greece
 Tales of Unsurpassed Vanity #1-10. MoJo/Dark Wave Comics, 2001-2004.
 Jazz and Maria TPB – collects the vampire stories from Tales of Unsurpassed Vanity #1-5. MoJo/Dark Wave Comics, 2002.
 SubArt Comics #1-3. Tsiki-Tsiki Productions, 2002-2003.
 Hesiod's Theogony. Evandros Press, 2003. 
 SubArt Comics #1-3. Giganto, 2003-2004. ISSN 1109-9224
 Babel #226. 2004.
 Sapilla #1-3. 2004-2005. (participation with short stories and front cover)
 Homer's Iliad (Ομήρου Ιλιάς). Evandros Press, 2004.
 Homer's Odyssey (Ομήρου Οδύσσεια). Evandros Press, 2004.
  magazine (2004)
 Autobio Comics, weekly short stories published within Paraskevi+13 (Παρασκευή+13) newspaper (2005-2006)
 Red.Dot Comix #10, 2004, #12, 2005. (participation with short stories and pin-ups)
 24 Hours SubArt Comics. Tsiki-Tsiki Productions, 2005.
 Roppongi #2. 2006. (participation with a pin-up)
 Herodotus' The Battle of Thermopylae (Ηροδότου Η Μάχη των Θερμοπυλών). Evandros Press, 2006.
 Giant-Size Fascists. Haramada, 2007. 
 Autobio Comics, gonzo journalist comics published within Big Fish magazine. 2007-2008.
  (Γαλέρα) magazine (monthly episodes of Giant-Size Fascists and short comics stories). 2007-2008.
 Giant-Size Fascists ConMix Extravaganza. Jemma Press, 2009. 
 Autodivine - EP. Jemma Press, 2009. 
 At The Drive Ink (short story in anthology inspired by garage rock band The Last Drive). Tilt Comics, 2010.
 Giant-Size Fascists reprint. Jemma Press, 2010.

Works in UK
 Dryland Book One|||Chapter One. 2012.
 Dryland Book One. Markosia Enterprises, 2016. 
 Tales of The Smiths. Omnibus Press, 2018. 
 King: The graphic biography of Jack Kirby Chapter One. Self-published, 2018. 
 Rebel Rebel The graphic biography of David Bowie Chapter One. Self-published, 2018. 
 Rebel Rebel The graphic biography of David Bowie Chapter Two. Self-published, 2019. 
 Rebel Rebel The graphic biography of David Bowie Chapter Three. Self-published, 2020. 
 Rebel Rebel The graphic biography of David Bowie Chapter Four. Self-published, 2021. 
 Rebel Rebel The graphic biography of David Bowie Chapter Five. Self-published, 2021. 
 Rebel Rebel The graphic biography of David Bowie Chapter Six. Self-published, 2022. 
 Rebel Rebel The graphic biography of David Bowie Chapter Seven. Self-published, 2022.

Webcomics
 Autobio Comics. Deviantart and Blogspot, 2004-2009.
 Tales of The Smiths. Socomic.gr, 2012-2014.
 Dryland Book One. Socomic.gr, 2015-2016.
 Rebel Rebel The graphic biography of David Bowie. Socomic.gr, 2016-.
 King: The graphic biography of Jack Kirby. Webtoons, 2017-.

Digital Comics
 Tales of The Smiths. ComiXology, 2018.
 King: The graphic biography of Jack Kirby Chapter One. ComiXology, 2020.
 Rebel Rebel The graphic biography of David Bowie Chapter One. ComiXology, 2020.
 Rebel Rebel The graphic biography of David Bowie Chapter Two. ComiXology, 2021.

Other work

As illustrator
 Freelance editorial illustrator for Big Fish magazine (2007-2009)
 Illustrator for lecture series at Amnesty International (2012)
 Illustrator/Graphic Designer for The International Federation of Red Cross and Red Crescent Societies' communication needs with the refugee crisis (2016)

As animator
 Animator and editor of the music video for Thodoris Triantafillou & CJ Jeff feat. Nomi Ruiz's cover of "Dirty Cash (Money Talks)" (2013)

Discography
 Autodivine - EP. Jemma Press, 2009.  
 Ghosts of Future Past - 4X84 EP. 2014.

References

Works cited

External links
 

Living people
Australian comics artists
Greek comics artists
Year of birth missing (living people)
Graphic novelists
People from Victoria (Australia)